Matamata-Piako District is a local government area in the Waikato region of New Zealand. It lies to the east of the city of Hamilton.

Geography
The district encompasses the southern end of the Hauraki Plains and much of the Thames Valley, and is bounded in the east by the Kaimai Range. The rivers Piako and Waihou run through the district.

The towns of Matamata, Morrinsville and Te Aroha are all within the district, with the Council's head office based in Te Aroha. The main industry in the region is dairy farming and Thoroughbred breeding and training. Other communities in the district include Mangateparu and Waitoa.

Populated places
Matamata-Piako District consists of the following towns, localities, settlements and communities:

 Matamata Ward:
 Buckland
 Gordon
 Hinuera
 Matai
 Matamata
 Okauia South
 Okauia
 Paratu
 Peria
 Piarere
 Richmond Downs
 Selwyn
 Taihoa
 Tamihana
 Te Poi
 Turangaomoana
 Waharoa
 Walton
 Wardville

 Morrinsville Ward:
 Hoe-O-Tainui
 Kereone
 Kiwitahi
 Kuranui
 Mangateparu
 Morrinsville
 Motumaoho
 Piako
 Rukumoana
 Tahuna
 Tahuroa
 Tatuanui
 Tauhei
 Te Puninga
 Waiti

 Te Aroha Ward:
 Chudleigh
 Elstow
 Hungahunga
 Manawaru
 Mangaiti
 Ngarua
 Otway
 Shaftesbury
 Springdale
 Te Aroha
 Te Aroha West
 Waihou
 Waiorongomai
 Wairakau
 Waitoa

Demographics

Matamata-Piako District had a population of 34,404 at the 2018 New Zealand census, an increase of 2,868 people (9.1%) since the 2013 census, and an increase of 3,921 people (12.9%) since the 2006 census. There were 12,873 households, comprising 17,001 males and 17,403 females, giving a sex ratio of 0.98 males per female. The median age was 40.8 years (compared with 37.4 years nationally), with 6,999 people (20.3%) aged under 15 years, 6,186 (18.0%) aged 15 to 29, 14,436 (42.0%) aged 30 to 64, and 6,783 (19.7%) aged 65 or older.

Ethnicities were 84.4% European/Pākehā, 16.7% Māori, 2.1% Pacific peoples, 5.7% Asian, and 1.7% other ethnicities. People may identify with more than one ethnicity.

The percentage of people born overseas was 14.4, compared with 27.1% nationally.

Although some people chose not to answer the census's question about religious affiliation, 51.4% had no religion, 35.8% were Christian, 0.9% had Māori religious beliefs, 0.8% were Hindu, 0.3% were Muslim, 0.9% were Buddhist and 1.8% had other religions.

Of those at least 15 years old, 3,204 (11.7%) people had a bachelor's or higher degree, and 7,203 (26.3%) people had no formal qualifications. The median income was $32,400, compared with $31,800 nationally. 4,221 people (15.4%) earned over $70,000 compared to 17.2% nationally. The employment status of those at least 15 was that 13,566 (49.5%) people were employed full-time, 4,077 (14.9%) were part-time, and 876 (3.2%) were unemployed.

Twin cities
Matamata-Piako is twinned with:
  Ballina, New South Wales, Australia

References

External links

 District council's site
 Te Aroha i-SITE Information Centre
 Matamata i-SITE Information Centre